FC Vertikal Kalinkovichi is a Belarusian football club based in Kalinkovichi, Gomel Voblast.

History
The club was founded in 1996. It spent the majority of its seasons playing in Belarusian Second League, with the exception of 2003 and 2004 (the team played in the First League) and two seasons in 2012 and 2013 (playing in Gomel Oblast regional league). Since 2014 the team rejoined Second League.

In 2021, Vertikal was revived rejoined Second League once again.

Current squad
As of March 2023

References

External links
 Profile at teams.by
 Profile at football.by

Football clubs in Belarus
1996 establishments in Belarus
Association football clubs established in 1996